Sydney Morgan may refer to:

 Syd Morgan, Plaid Cymru politician
 Sydney, Lady Morgan (1781?–1859), Irish novelist
 Sydney Cope Morgan (1887–1967), British barrister and politician